Elvisi Dusha (born 15 July 1994) is an Albanian-British professional basketball player for the Plymouth City Patriots of the British Basketball League. He plays for the Albania national team. Born in London, he has also played for the Surrey Scorchers, Plymouth Raiders, Worcester Wolves, and Prishtina. He signed with the Plymouth Raiders on 31 August 2020.

On 13 September 2021, Dusha signed for newly-founded club Plymouth City Patriots. In November 2022, the British Basketball League named Dusha was named as Player of the Month.

References

1994 births
Living people
Albanian men's basketball players
English men's basketball players
Albanian expatriate basketball people in Kosovo
British expatriate basketball people in Kosovo
English people of Albanian descent
Point guards
Basketball players from Greater London
London City Royals players
Plymouth Raiders players
Plymouth City Patriots players